Luther High School may refer to one of the following high schools:

In Canada:
Luther College High School — Regina, Saskatchewan

In the United States:
Luther High School (Florida) — Orlando, Florida
Luther High School (Oklahoma) — Luther, Oklahoma
Luther High School (Wisconsin) — Onalaska, Wisconsin
Luther Burbank High School — Sacramento, California
Luther East High School — Lansing, Illinois
Luther High School North — Chicago, Illinois
Luther South Math, Science & Performing Arts High School — Chicago, Illinois
Martin Luther High School — Greendale, Wisconsin
Martin Luther High School (Minnesota) — Northrop, Minnesota
Martin Luther High School (New York City) — Maspeth, New York
Martin Luther High School (Wisconsin) — Greendale, Wisconsin